Luciano Solis (born 7 January 1962) is a Mexican boxer. He competed in the men's lightweight event at the 1984 Summer Olympics.

References

1962 births
Living people
Lightweight boxers
Mexican male boxers
Olympic boxers of Mexico
Boxers at the 1984 Summer Olympics
Pan American Games competitors for Mexico
Boxers at the 1983 Pan American Games
Place of birth missing (living people)